Rexford Schultz Rudicel (September 6, 1912 – March 20, 2000) was an American professional basketball player. He played for the Indianapolis Kautskys in the National Basketball League during the 1938–39 season but appeared in only three games. He played college basketball and baseball at Ball State University. In his post-professional playing career, Rudicel coached high school basketball from 1938 to 1969.

References

1912 births
2000 deaths
American men's basketball players
Ball State Cardinals baseball players
Ball State Cardinals men's basketball players
Basketball coaches from Indiana
Basketball players from Indiana
Guards (basketball)
Indianapolis Kautskys players
High school basketball coaches in Indiana
Sportspeople from Muncie, Indiana